Foch Hospital (French: Hôpital Foch) is a hospital in the Suresnes, France. It is part of the Établissement de santé privé d'intérêt collectif

It was established in 1929 with the help of Consuelo Vanderbilt and Winnaretta Singer. It was named in honour of Ferdinand Foch.

Notable doctors
Through its history, the Foch Hospital hosted notable doctors, among others:
 Jozef Cywinski (b. 1936), Polish-American scientist ;
 Gilles Dreyfus (b. 1951), French cardiac surgeon ;
 Jean-Louis Sebagh, French cosmetic doctor.

References

External links

Hospitals in Île-de-France
Infrastructure completed in 1929
Hospital buildings completed in 1929
Teaching hospitals in France
Buildings and structures in Île-de-France
Hospitals established in 1929
1929 establishments in France
Suresnes
20th-century architecture in France